Subharti College of Physiotherapy, formerly Jyotirao Phule physiotherapy college, is located in Meerut, Uttar Pradesh, India. The college was established in 1999.

Campus

The college campus is outside the city on an area of over 250 acres of land with playgrounds LTs and labs. There is a 1250-bed hospital attached to the college.

Programs

The academic programme exposes the students to practical aspects through seminars, group discussions and lectures of experts invited from other institutions.
The college runs a free Out-patient department throughout the year.

Departments

1. Exercise Therapy Department

2. Electrotherapy Department

3. Physiotherapy Out-patient and in patient Department

Principal

Dr. Jasmine Anandabai

Physiotherapy organizations
Universities and colleges in Meerut
Educational institutions established in 1999
1999 establishments in Uttar Pradesh